Madonna of Laroque is an oil painting on a poplar board (48 cm / 59 cm) created between 1502-1503. It represents the Child and his mother next to John the Baptist. There has been speculation that the painting may be by Leonardo da Vinci.

References

External links
 Official site in French.
 review.
 daylife.com

1503 paintings
Paintings of the Madonna and Child